Watson Lake may refer to:

 Watson Lake, Yukon, a town in Canada
Watson Lake (electoral district), elects a member of the Legislative Assembly of the Yukon Territory, Canada
 Watson Lake (Arizona), a lake in the United States
 Watson Lake (California), a lake in the Sierra Nevada near Lake Tahoe
 Watson Lake, a lake in Faulkner County, Arkansas, United States
 Watson Lake, a lake in Logan County, Arkansas, United States
 Watson Lake (Radium line), a tugboat built and operated by the Radium Line, see boats of the Mackenzie River Watershed